Baixiang County is a county in the southwest of Hebei province, China. It lies generally to the east of G4 Beijing–Hong Kong and Macau Expressway and China National Highway 107. The Baixiang County is known as being the former capital of the state of Xiang of the Southern Huns state Later Zhao, described in the Fang Xuanling Book of Jin Chapter 104, was located in the territory of the county. It was a place of the 351 CE Battle of Xiangguo between Ran Min's army and Shi Zhi of Later Zhao. After the battle, the Later Zhao general Liu Xian killed Shi Zhi in Xiangguo, the Xiangguo city was burned, and its population moved to Yecheng.

Administrative divisions
The county administers 3 towns and 3 townships.

Towns
Baixiang
Guchengdian
Xiwang

Townships
Wangjiazhuang Township
Neibu Township
Longhua Township

Climate

References

External links

 
County-level divisions of Hebei
Xingtai